The Christmas and Cocos Islands tropical forests ecoregion (WWF ID: IM0110) covers forested areas of Christmas Island and North Keeling Island, two small seamount islands south of the Indonesian island of Java.  The forests of these two islands share tree species of the Indo-Pacific and Melanesian types on nearby islands, the forests of Christmas Island and North Keeling Island are unique in how they reflect the effects of large populations of terrestrial red crabs (Gecarcoidea natalis).  Because of the remoteness of the islands, there are many endemic species.

Location and description

Christmas Island

Christmas Island, 350 km southwest of the island of Java, is mostly forested.  Of its 135 km2 total area, 85 km2 is protected by the Christmas Island National Park.  The island is a limestone cover of an ancient submerged volcano, with eroded terraces and an interior plateau.

Cocos (Keeling) Islands

Of the Cocos (Keeling) Islands, only North Keeling Island has significant forest, the other islands having mostly been converted to agricultural uses.  North Keeling Island is 900 km southwest of Christmas Island.  The Cocos Islands are also built on submerged seamounts, but the surface is limited to a low-lying coral atoll.

Climate
The climate of the ecoregion is Tropical monsoon climate (Köppen climate classification (Am)). This climate is characterized by relatively even temperatures throughout the year (all months being greater than  average temperature), and a pronounced dry season. This climate is mid-way between a tropical rainforest and a tropical savannah. Precipitation averages 2,000 mm/year. The wet monsoon season is from December to April.

Flora and fauna
Some trees reach . The characteristic tree species are Planchonella nitida, Syzygium nervosum, Tristiropsis acutangula, Inocarpus fagifer, and Hernandia ovigera. Undergrowth that exists is typically the vulnerable Lister's palm (Arenga listeri) and Pandanus elatus .

Over 100 million red crabs (Gecarcoidea natalis) are estimated to live in the woods; they keep most of the forest floor clear of fallen leaves and other litter.  Christmas Island is also home to the vulnerable Christmas Island hawk-owl (Ninox natalis).

Protected areas
About 9% of the ecoregion is part of an officially protected area, including:
 Christmas Island National Park
 Pulu Keeling National Park

References

Indomalayan ecoregions
Ecoregions of Australia
Tropical and subtropical moist broadleaf forests